Evangelos Marinakis (born 30 July 1967) is a Greek media mogul, shipowner, lyricist and member of the Piraeus city council. He is the founder and owner of Capital Maritime & Trading Corp and also the owner of the football clubs Olympiacos in Greece and Nottingham Forest in England.

Early life

Evangelos Marinakis was born in Piraeus, Greece on 30 July 1967. He is the only son of Miltiadis Marinakis and Irini Marinaki (née Karakatsani). His father, Miltiadis Marinakis, was born in Crete. He was a shipowner, a Member of the Greek Parliament and, at times, a financial supporter of Piraeus football club, Olympiacos. Marinakis holds a B.A. in 'International Business Administration' and an M.Sc. in 'International Relations'.

Career

Shipping
Marinakis is the founder and chairman of Capital Maritime & Trading Corp. 

According to Lloyd’s List, in November 2022, “his Capital Group controled nearly 100 vessels, exceeding 10.5m dwt and valued at about $9bn. During 2021 and the first 10 months of 2022, it was involved in 75 transactions worth $5.5bn. The 47 vessel acquisitions among these … could overwhelmingly be classed as investments in greener ships… In the past couple of years, Mr Marinakis’s biggest investment has been in the LNG sector, with a total of 14 174,000 cbm newbuildings ordered at Hyundai Heavy Industries and Hyundai Samho”.

In October 2021 on the occasion of the listing of CPLP’s first bond on the Athens Stock Exchange (ATHEX) he said that “we have been engaged with financial markets since 2007 when we were first listed in New York at the Nasdaq stock exchange. Since then we have paid more than $800 million in dividends to our investors”. The bond issue raised €150 million. Registered offers exceeded €800 mln, with an overrun of the issue by 5.3 times with very significant interest from private and institutional investors. 

A second ATHEX public offering by CPLP of €100 million also generated impressive demand by Greek investors. The issue was oversubscribed 3.6 times, with offers reaching €360 million. The net proceeds of both offerings were used for vessel acquisitions, debt repayment and working capital purposes.

The Capital Maritime Group which is controlled by the Marinakis family, managed a mixed fleet of more than 70 ships in 2017, including tankers, container ships and dry bulk carriers. Capital Group entered the LNG segment in 2018, ordering up to 10 LNG ships of a total value of 1.8billion.

From March 2010 until September 2011, Marinakis also served as Chairman and Chief Executive Officer of NYSE-listed Crude Carriers Corp. Between March 2007 and December 2014 he was chairman of Capital Product Partners L.P. (NASDAQ:CPLP). In November 2018, Capital Product Partners L.P. announced the merger of its tanker fleet with DSS Holdings, whose largest shareholder is WL Ross & Co., thus creating one of the biggest listed tanker companies in the world, in a transaction valued at $1.65bn.

From 1992 to 2005, Marinakis was the commercial manager of Capital Ship Management Corp. and oversaw the businesses of the group of companies that now form Capital Maritime. For the past decades, he has also been active in several other family-controlled businesses all related to the shipping industry.

Political career 
In May 2014, Marinakis was elected first member of the Piraeus city council with the Piraeus Winner independent ticket, that he co-founded with Yannis Moralis, vice-president of Olympiacos F.C. Among their pledges were the preservation of the public nature of Piraeus Port Authority and the development of Piraeus as Europe's largest cruise ship destination and home port.

After the election, Reuters declared that "rarely has big business mingled so openly with politics in a country where contacts between the two are usually conducted behind the scenes". Marinakis responded, in a Tradewinds interview, that he can see no reason why someone with a strong record in business cannot get into politics, calling that stance "Paleolithic logic", "I am not afraid to be involved in politics, because I have no business with the Greek state" he said. Since the elections, he undertook the construction of squares, parks, children's playgrounds and sports facilities, at his own cost, as the municipality of Piraeus lacks the necessary funds due to the economic crisis.

In May 2019 Marinakis was re-elected first member of the Piraeus city council with the Piraeus Winner independent ticket led by mayor Yannis Moralis.

Sports
Since mid-2010 Marinakis has owned Piraeus' hometown team Olympiacos, and serves as its president. During his presidency of Olympiacos, the team won the Greek League title for seven consecutive seasons from 2010–11 to 2016–17, 2020 to 2022 and the National Cup for the 2011–12, 2012–13, 2014–15 and 2020 seasons.

Marinakis served as president of the Superleague Greece and vice-president of the Hellenic Football Federation (HFF) from August 2010 until September 2011. Additionally, during the summer of 2022 he was elected as president of Superleague Greece for the second time.

In May 2017, it was announced that Marinakis had completed a transaction to become the majority shareholder in English Championship club and former double European Cup winners Nottingham Forest.

The Nottingham Post noted that Marinakis’ acquisition of the club heralds “an exciting future that gives genuine reason for optimism”. Meanwhile, manager Mark Warburton commented that he expects Marinakis and his team to be ambitious for Nottingham Forest. “... they are aware of the club's stature and they are good football people,” Warburton was quoted as saying.

Following his takeover of Forest, Marinakis aimed for the club to qualify for Europe within five years, as well as having a redeveloped stadium and training ground. Although Forest have announced £50 million plans to redevelop to the City Ground and the Nigel Doughty Academy, On May 29, 2022, Forest won promotion to the Premier League for the first time in 23 years.

Media 
In September 2016, Marinakis, through his company Alter Ego Media S.A., won one of four national television licenses auctioned in Greece after spending EUR 73.9m ($82.8m) in a highly unusual competitive bidding process. The license was however revoked on 26 October 2016 since the Greek Council of State held that the TV license law of Minister of State Nikos Pappas was unconstitutional.

In July 2017, Alter Ego was confirmed by a Greek first-instance court as the acquirer of the Lambrakis Press Group (DOL). The court approval for the transfer ownership of DOL to Alter Ego followed the latter's success as the highest bidder in an auction process held earlier in 2017. The court ratified the sale and granted a request by DOL staff that the auction procedure be accepted as valid. The completion of the transfer of ownership was also supported by trade unions representing DOL staff. DOL is one of Greece's historic major media groups and includes the top selling Ta Nea and To Vima newspapers, two of the country's oldest dailies, as well as a popular news portal, magazines and radio station. As of March 2018 the agreement for DOL has not yet been approved by the Competition Committee. It also holds a 22% stake in Mega Channel TV station.

In February 2021, Marinakis wrote the lyrics of the hit song 'Excitement' ('Eksapsi') by Greek pop star Natassa Theodoridou. Following the songs release, the song reached one million views on YouTube within the first six days.

In 2022 he was elected president of Super League Greece.

Awards and distinctions 
Having "grown his shipping empire from the small company he took over from his father, which controlled seven bulk carriers", he is regarded as one of the most important and influential shipping personalities worldwide. He was included in the Lloyd's List "One Hundred Most Influential People in the Shipping Industry" list, ranking 41st in 2022, 47th in 2021, 59th in 2020, 2019 and 2018, 66th in 2017, 61st in 2016, 65th in 2015, 67th in 2014, 73rd in 2013, 84th in 2012, 84th in 2011, and 88th in 2010. He was also included in the TradeWinds "Power 100" list of the ‘top shipowners and operators", ranking 31st in 2012 and 75th in 2010. In 2014 and 2010 he was awarded the "Newsmaker of the Year" award at the annual Lloyd's List "Greek Shipping Awards", while in 2009 his company, Capital Ship Management Corp. was awarded the "Tanker Company of the Year" award. In 2016, he was awarded the first ever "Xenakoudis Excellence in Shipping Award" by the International Registries, Inc./The Marshall Islands Registry. In November 2017, Marinakis received the Lloyd's List "Greek Shipping Personality of the Year" Award at a special ceremony in Athens. Nigel Lowry of Lloyd's List said Marinakis was the "outstanding candidate" for the award and noted his $1 billion investment in fleet capacity in 2017, his "dynamic dealmaking" in the shipping sector, as well as a range of other activities across philanthropy, sports and media.

In 2022 he received the Tanker Shipping & Trade Industry Leader award. In its justification was mentioned “Capital Group’s strategy is focusing on cleaner maritime transportation and it has effectively shifted towards the transition to ‘green’ shipping by further diversifying into the LNG segment and through investments and research in digitalisation, cyber security, new greener fuels technologies, and sustainable shipping-oriented projects. In this respect, 2021-2022 was an important year for the group, as Capital’s investments in newer, greener vessels amounted to US$5.3Bn over 73 transactions, placing Capital group among the most active in the S&P front, while also presenting one of the largest and most advanced shipbuilding programmes in Greece and internationally”.

Personal life
On 10 March 2020, Marinakis announced on social media that he is recovering from COVID-19 and taking all the necessary measures according to the doctor's instructions. During the outbreak that started in 2019, Marinakis showed symptoms of and tested positive for COVID-19 on his return to Greece in March 2020 after attending Nottingham Forest's game on 6 March and also the Harlem Globetrotters show piece at Nottingham's Motorpoint Arena.
On 24 March, he said he had fully recovered from the effects of the virus.

Philanthropy 
He has a role as a philanthropist, both privately and as president of Olympiacos F.C. He personally supports the operation of the museum dedicated to the Greek author Nikos Kazantzakis in the island of Crete with €80,000 yearly for an initial period of 10 years from July 2014. In September 2014, he privately financed commemorative celebrations for the 200 years since the foundation of the Filiki Etairia and the creation of a bust of Alexander Ypsilantis in Athens. He has also privately supported throughout the years various Greek children charities, including Argo, and 'Together for Children', a union of ten Greek NGOs.

During his presidency, Olympiacos FC, has funded the daily meals of a thousand people weekly, through the benevolent fund of "Genesios Theotokos" parish in the Athens suburb of Nikaia and the Syros Holy Church. In 2010, Olympiacos hosted a UNDP Match Against Poverty which raised over US$500,000 for earthquake stricken Haiti and Pakistan. Approximately a thousand food portions and clothing items were distributed daily to refugees stranded at the Port of Piraeus. In February 2014, he donated €500,000 for school repairs in the Greek island of Cephalonia, which was hit by destructive earthquakes. In October 2013, Olympiacos and UNICEF launched a partnership to immunize children in developing countries, featuring UNICEF’s logo on the players’ jerseys, with the target to raise €2 million in two years. In August 2017, the club announced that the partnership would be renewed with a focus on a new multi-year campaign. In June 2012, Marinakis repurchased Greek national debt, with a face value of €1,364,000 by offering the amount of €168,590 on behalf of each of Olympiacos' 55 Greek players and employees, to Peter Nomikos’ NGO ‘Greece Debt Free’ (GDF). In the past, Olympiacos has supported the Japan earthquake relief fund, and acted in support to the non-profit environmental organization ‘Arcturos’, the pediatric clinics of ‘St Sofia’ hospital in Athens and the ‘General Hospital’ in Limassol, various blood collection campaigns, Greek and international children's charities, including 'Elpida', the ‘Steven Gerrard Foundation’, the ‘Hatzikyriakos Foundation’. Marinakis is also in the process of creating the Olympiacos charity foundation.

In September 2017, Marinakis sponsored a special conference in Athens in partnership with Harvard University, to focus on football's social responsibility, with specific reference to refugees. At the event, Marinakis said: "football can cross borders, overcome ancient enmity and bring millions of people around the world together". In November 2017, Marinakis led an aid effort, through Olympiacos FC, to bring relief to the victims of massive flooding that hit the town of Mandra in the Attica region of Greece. The effort, included a large quantity of food, bottled water, and other daily necessities sent to those struggling in the aftermath of the flooding. In July 2018, Marinakis donated €1 million through Olympiacos FC, to help the victims of the deadliest wildfires to hit Greece in decades, which swept through an area near Athens. "In these difficult times, all us Greeks need to stand united at the side of our fellow citizens who suffer", the team said in a statement. In April 2019 fundraising was completed for the creation of the “Miltiadis Marinakis Professorship for Modern Greek Language and Culture” at the Ohio State University where the local Greek community raised $1 million with Evangelos Marinakis as lead sponsor. This move will safeguard the operation of the OSU ‘Modern Greek Studies’ department that was destined to close.
In November 2020, Nottingham Forest F.C. supported Framework's Homeless to Home Challenge major fundraising campaign to combat homelessness. Marinakis was praised for the tremendous support. In the same month, Nottingham Forest F.C. also supported Football Shirt Friday going the extra mile. Marinakis was commended for his ongoing community support. In December 2020, Angeliki Frangou and Marinakis teamed up to present a $1.8 million donation to an Athens hospital. The money funded 12 new intensive care beds.

Controversy

Sports
On 21 February 2011, Olympiacos beat Panathinaikos in Karaiskaki Stadium (2–1) in a game with controversial officiating. After the game, player Djibril Cissé had a wrangle with Olympiacos' president Marinakis. He was beaten by Olympiakos' fans and stated that he was going to appeal to the UEFA. The case of Cissé and Marinakis went to the Greek courts, where Marinakis was found not guilty.

In 2015, the Public Prosecutor and the Council of Judges acquitted Marinakis in relation to the Koriopolis match-fixing investigation, that begun in 2011, that was launched after UEFA gave Greek authorities a report citing irregular betting patterns, mostly involving Greek Cup and second division games in 2009 and 2010. He was accused of participating in a match-fixing criminal network with links with seven countries. At the time, UEFA officials said no action was presently being considered against Olympiacos regarding its participation in the Champions League in the following season, because evidence in the Greek investigation cast no doubt over its 2010–11 league victory. Marinakis was charged with complicity to commit acts of bribery and match manipulation, of instigation and facilitating acts of violence. Marinakis, along with the president of second-division club Ilioupoli, Giorgos Tsakogiannis and others, cooperated so that a group of hardcore Olympiacos fans would travel on 13 March 2011 to a third division match and provoke riots to bring about a penalty. The prosecutor's report says that "Tsakogiannis informed [Ioannis] Papadopoulos that he had made arrangements and Evangelos Marinakis was aware of the plan for Olympiacos fans to cause riots". Marinakis was acquitted from all charges by the Prosecutor, Panagiotis Poulios, and the Council of Judges.

In 2014, Marinakis was acquitted by the Three Members Court of First Instance relatively to the case of entering the referee's (Thanassis Yiachos's) locker room at halftime during the football cup final between Olympiacos and Asteras Tripolis, against football regulations to complain about the decisions taken. Marinakis stated that he went to the referee's locker room at halftime only to wish match officials "good luck". Olympiacos went on and won the match 3–1, after a tense 1–1 at halftime. In 2015 Marinakis was also acquitted by the Three Members Court of Appeals for the same case.

Another investigation which led to the 2015 Greek football scandal, started in 2014 after prosecutor Aristidis Koreas was given the go-ahead by a council of judges to make use of secretly recorded phone conversations that point to the involvement of various sports officials, including Evangelos Marinakis. According to Koreas, "the president of Olympiakos and close associates approached and tried to use policemen, judges, politicians and other powerful figures for their own ends as part of the planning and establishment of a criminal organization". According to the prosecutor, Marinakis was helped by the President of the Greek Football Association, Giorgos Sarris, to choose specific referees to oversee key games. He has repeatedly denied all charges: "These allegations have nothing to do with me and have no effect on me whatsoever," Marinakis said. "There is not one shred of evidence against me." On 3 October 2014, Aristidis Koreas, though he was replaced as athletic prosecutor, he remained on the case. Evangelos Marinakis was questioned on 18 June 2015 and he was released on a €200,000 bail. He was also forced to stop being involved in any football activity, as well as he must report to a police station every 15 days. In September 2016, the prosecutor proposed the imprisonment of Mr Marinakis, to which Marinakis responded with a lawsuit against the prosecutor. In November 2017, the judicial council of the Court of Appeals rejected imposing provisional custody on Evangelos Marinakis and also dropped various charges after deeming them "absolutely groundless". Marinakis was also resigned from president of the team due to legal reasons, giving his seat to Yiannis Moralis. On 26 March 2018, Marinakis was vindicated by the Greek Supreme Court. The decision of the Greek Supreme Court confirmed that the allegations against him were unfounded.

In April 2019, the Supreme Civil and Criminal Court of Greece decided that Mr Marinakis with other 27, will have a trial for the 2015 Greek football scandal. The final accusations are the felony crime of "match fixing" and creation of a gang, instead of a criminal organization.

On 28 January 2021, the three-member criminal court of appeal has unanimously acquitted Olympiakos and Nottingham Forest owner Vangelis Marinakis and 27 others of match-fixing in a case stretching back several years.

Athens judges ruled that there is no evidence for the two charges attributed to the defendants following their alleged participation in a criminal group including altering the outcome of matches.

Finally, V. Marinakis was permanently acquitted by the Ethics Committee for the category of match-fixing.

Alleged drug trafficking
A Greek drug trafficking investigation that started in 2014, regarding ‘Noor 1’, a ship owned by Pantelis Kalafatis, was investigated by the Greek Coast Guard, the DEA and the Greek judicial authorities and culminated in the conviction of various individuals and two arrest warrants for Turkish nationals.

In March 2018, Marinakis was charged with drug trafficking. The accusations against Marinakis were described as "very serious charges" following an investigation after the tanker Noor 1 was intercepted at the Greek port of Piraeus carrying 2.1 tonnes of heroin in 2014. According to the jailed co-owner of Noor 1, Efthymios Yiannousakis, the vessel had in fact carried an additional ton of heroin (worth $70 million) which was unloaded on the island of Crete and trafficked to mainland Europe before Greek authorities managed to intercept the rest of the cargo.  The judicial council of the Piraeus Lower Court touched on all related issues and ruled that the prosecutor's order was not justified.

Nottingham Forest F.C. chairman Nicholas Randall wrote an open letter to supporters reaffirming his support for Evangelos Marinakis. Randall confirmed the matter was under investigation but that "there is no ‘charge’ against Marinakis and no ‘prosecution’ is in process."

In January 2021, after reviewing the case, the judge came to the conclusion that there was no evidence implicating Marinakis, and therefore concluded his investigation.

References

Greek businesspeople in shipping
Olympiacos F.C. presidents
1967 births
Living people
Greek chief executives
Nottingham Forest F.C.
Greek football chairmen and investors
Politicians from Piraeus
Greek city councillors
Chairmen and investors of football clubs in England